Mard ( 'Man') is a 1985 Indian Hindi-language action film, directed by Manmohan Desai. Starring Amitabh Bachchan and Amrita Singh. The movie was remade in Tamil as Maaveeran. Amitabh Bachchan was nominated for Filmfare Award for Best Actor category. Mard was the second  highest-grossing film. of the year. and the eighth highest-grossing film of the 1980s (1980 to 1989). Furthermore, when adjusted for inflation, Mard is one of the highest-grossing films released during the Diwali festival, approximately more than 450cr nett. in today's time.

Plot

The film opens in India. It is the early 20th century when India remains part of the British empire. The opening sequence shows a group of British soldiers plundering an Indian fort and taking its riches by air England. They are stopped by the valiant Raja Azad Singh (Dara Singh), who is immensely strong and manages to lasso the light aircraft, subdue several English soldiers and recover the stolen jewels. Around this time, Raja Azad Singh's wife Rani Durga (Nirupa Roy) gives birth to a baby boy, who is named Raju. Raja carves the word mard (man, intending to convey strength and bravery) into the newborn's chest, noting proudly that the baby is smiling throughout, and can apparently feel no pain. (His words, mard ko dard nahin hota, meaning "a true man feels no pain", are a recurring dialogue throughout the movie.) The British commission conducts an investigation, led by a sympathetic and liberal Englishwoman, Lady Helena; the investigation uncovers the atrocities of the English troops and results in several officers being officially reprimanded. Lady Helena is a close confidante of Raja Azad Singh and is generally supportive of Raja and the idea of India gaining independence from British rule.

The English officers General Dyer (Kamal Kapoor) and Inspector Simon (Bob Christo) conspire with a snivelling, weak-willed local doctor Harry (Prem Chopra) to capture Raja. Harry sedates Raja; weakened thus, Raja is captured and imprisoned in a dungeon. Rani Durga escapes on Raja's faithful steed Bahadur. But she is shot, and the horse brings baby Raju to a local orphanage for safekeeping until Rani Durga can recuperate and reclaim him. The wife of a poor blacksmith spots baby Raju in the orphanage, asks after him and eventually adopts him. When Rani Durga returns, she is shocked to find her baby gone and she loses the ability to speak. The penniless Rani Durga eventually becomes a washerwoman. The traitor Harry is appointed mayor of the town for his part in the capture of Raja.

Raju grows up to become a strong youth under the care of the loving blacksmith and his wife. His day job is to run a tanga. One day, he happens across an arrogant and oppressive young woman who blithely runs her car over an old lady. Raju gives chase, intercepts the young woman, and compels her to apologise to the old lady. The young woman is of high birth, and her bodyguard Zybisko (Manik Irani) engages Raju, but Raju fends him off quite easily. The young woman turns out to be Ruby, the daughter of mayor Harry. Ruby apologises. But she is charmed by Raju's rugged looks and candour. He initially refuses her advances to maintain his independence. But she eventually falls in love, changes his heart, and invites him to her birthday party.

Harry and General Dyer continue their relentless quest for power. Their first move is to demolish the basti (slum colony) in front of Harry's mansion. Raju rallies the basti dwellers to oppose the demolition crew and picket Harry's mansion. Harry arrests Raju and is about to execute him when Lady Helena arrives on the scene. Lady Helena stops the demolition (citing lack of documentation), reprimands Harry, and releases Raju. Harry tries to buy off Raju, but Raju douses the cases with liquor, sets it afire, and uses the soot to blacken Harry's face. (No, it is certainly black money, for it burns black, he observes!) A frustrated Harry tries to have him a shot, but Ruby intervenes, professes her love for the tanga wallah (tanga driver), and threatens to completely disavow her father if any harm should befall him. Unable to subdue or subvert Raju, a frustrated set of cronies (Harry, Dyer, Simon, and others) fret and fume.

The film introduces Danny (Dan Dhanoa) the son of General Dyer. Danny is every bit as corrupt, cunning, and avaricious as his father and his cronies. Danny runs the nefarious operations beneath the outwardly clean, lordly and manorial life of General Dyer and mayor Harry. There are three such operations. First, there is a secret blood camp; basti dwellers that are infirm, aged or otherwise unfit are secretly abducted and their blood (all of it) is involuntarily extracted to supply British war campaigns elsewhere. Second, there is a slave labour camp where, again, basti dwellers are put to work (with no pay) on various civil and construction projects for the British empire. And finally there is Raja Azad Singh, still imprisoned, and a champion for the basti and for the workers in the labour camps. His primary duty is to turn, by hand, a massive flour mill; this mill is the only source of food for the camps. (Rani Durga, it turns out, is a washerwoman in one of these camps.) The camps grow in size, and Raja Azad Singh secretly plans to have them revolt; this becomes a growing concern for Harry.

Harry and General Dyer decide the best way to remove Raju from the picture is to announce the engagement of Ruby and Danny. Ruby strongly opposes this and runs off with Raju. Danny gives chase with his men, and even tries to kill Ruby, but eventually brings her back to Harry. Harry is truly enraged. He threatens to kill Ruby if she ever disobeys him again. Danny devises a nefarious plot to get rid of Raju.

As the first step in the plot, Danny captures the blacksmith, burns his hovel, murders his wife, and puts the blacksmith in a slave camp. (As she lays dying, she reveals to Raju the story of his birth. Raju cremates his foster mother and writes out a letter for his real mother, which he immerses into the river along with the ashes of his foster mother. The river carries his note to the camp where the blacksmith finds it and reads it out to Rani Durga, who immediately recalls her story. The blacksmith stages a stick-up to facilitate her escape, and she is ultimately reunited with Raju. The blacksmith, however, is killed.)

Danny learns of Raju's lineage. Realizing Raju will attack the camp to free the blacksmith and Raja Azad Singh, Danny plays the second step of his plot and lays a trap. Raju enters the dungeon to rescue his father. But it turns out that Raja Azad Singh has been replaced by a masked impostor (Simon), and Raju is captured.

At this point, Danny devises a fatal final step. He announces a gladiatorial sword fight between Raju and Raja Azad Singh where the winner will go free. Prior to this fight, he takes steps to ensure father and son are truly bloodthirsty for the other. Raja Azad Singh is brought to a blood camp where he sees Raju (actually a masked imposter) extracting blood from innocent citizens and swearing loyalty to the British; the Raja is incensed and swears to finish him off in the contest. Concurrently, Danny sends word (through Ruby) that the fighter opposing Raju will be a masked impostor and not the real Raja. Raju, in turn, announces he will not let his opponent leave the ring alive. And Danny forthwith arranges to have the real Raja fight Raju.

The contest begins on the next day, and father and son are soon in a crazed sword fight. The duel takes a turn when the Raja spots the word mard on Raju's chest, and Raju notices one of his blows drew blood from the Raja's cheek. They quickly discover the truth and keep up the appearance of a death duel until the Raja hoists Raju off the arena and into the viewing gallery. Raju plunges his sword into General Dyer, killing him instantly.

Danny is infuriated. He orders his tanks to finish off Raju and the Raja. (Lady Helena and Rani Durga are strapped to the tanks, with British soldiers holding them at gunpoint.) Raju and the Raja seize horses and escape, with the tanks in hot pursuit. After a long chase and fight, Raju and the Raja overpower the tanks, rescue the ladies and engage the villains in combat. After a hard sword-and-gun fight, Harry, Danny, and Goga are drowned in quicksand, and Raju and his father return victorious.

The film ends with Raju and Ruby coming together and being reunited with Raju's real parents, on the dawn of India's independence movement.

Cast
 Amitabh Bachchan as Raju Singh / Mard
 Amrita Singh as Ruby
 Dara Singh as Raja Azaad Singh
 Nirupa Roy as Rani Durga
 Prem Chopra as Dr. Harry
 Kamal Kapoor as General Dyer
 Bob Christo as Inspector Simon
 Satyendra Kapoor as Blacksmith (Jamuna's Husband)
 Manik Irani as Zbyszko (as Manek Irani)
 Seema Deo as Jamuna
 Dan Dhanoa as Danny Dyer
 Joginder Shelly as Street Dancer 'Jako Rakhe Saiyan'
 Kirti Kumar as Shamsher (Guest Appearance)
 C.S. Dubey as Lalaji (Father of Groom) (uncredited)
 Helena Luke as Lady Helena (uncredited)
 Shivraj as Priest (uncredited)

Location
Mard was mostly shot in Ooty (near a golf links site belonging to Hindustan Photo Films) and at various locations in Karnataka, such as the Lalitha Mahal in Mysore and the Bangalore Palace.

Soundtrack

Anu Malik composed music for Mard. The Soundtrack album consisting of 6 tracks was released on 7 June 1985 on T-Series.
Critics accused Desai of using double-meaning words in the song Hum to tamboo mein bamboo lagaye baithe. However, the song was a hit.
This is one of the films where Kishore Kumar did not sing for Amitabh Bachchan, as well as Coolie and Naseeb, due to Bachchan refusing to appear as a guest in a film which Kishore produced.

Box office
The film opened to nearly sold-out theatres and grossed approximately 16cr.

References

External links
 

1980s Hindi-language films
1985 films
Films directed by Manmohan Desai
Films about revolutions
Hindi films remade in other languages
Films scored by Anu Malik
Films about dogs
Films about pets